Delta Alpha Pi was a social fraternity was founded in 1919 at Ohio Wesleyan University. Most chapters and alumni merged with Phi Mu Delta in 1935.

History
Delta Alpha Pi was founded on November 22, 1919, at Ohio Wesleyan University. Its original name was Kappa Sigma Pi, but with an agreement with the local that would become the Beta chapter at Ohio State University, by 1921 the new organization settled on Delta Alpha Pi.  Its Founders were:

The purpose of the Founders was the inauguration of a type of fraternity for the development of Christian Character.

In 1927 Delta Alpha Pi became a Junior member of the NIC.

In the early years of the Great Depression, the chapters at Ohio Wesleyan University, University of Illinois and Butler University went inactive. In 1935, the decision was made to merge with Phi Mu Delta, however the chapter at Purdue University withdrew, eventually affiliating with Alpha Chi Rho. The remaining chapters and alumni merged into Phi Mu Delta in October 1935.

Chapters
These were the chapters of Delta Alpha Pi and their status at the time of dissolution.  Active chapters at that time in bold, inactive chapters in italics.

Symbols
Magazine - Cross and Shield - semi-annual
Badge - Shield mounted on a cross of which only the ends were visible. Upon the black background were two cross swords, above which were the Greek letters ΔΑΠ.

References

See also
 Phi Mu Delta

Defunct former members of the North American Interfraternity Conference
Student organizations established in 1919
1919 establishments in Ohio